Mariusz Fyrstenberg and Daniel Nestor are the defending champions, but chose not to participate together. Fyrstenberg played with Santiago González and lost in the first round to Robert Lindstedt and Marcin Matkowski. Nestor played with Rohan Bopanna and lost in the first round to Alexandr Dolgopolov and Kei Nishikori. 
Jamie Murray and John Peers won the title, defeating Dolgopolov and Nishikori  in the final, 6–3, 7–6(7–4).

Seeds

Draw

Draw

References
Main Draw

Men's Doubles
Brisbane International - Men's Doubles